The World Gymnaestrada is the largest general gymnastics exhibition. It is held every four years much like the Olympics. But the focus of this event is not on winning medals. The Gymnaestrada is about Group Performances – some with hundreds or even thousands of participants. Adults and children of every age and description perform. Countries from around the world come together to showcase their talent and the culture of their various countries. The choreography is designed both to challenge the participants and to delight audiences. Routines are performed at various venues within the host country. Large group routines are known as "mass routines" which involve hundreds of gymnasts. The mass routines are often performed in large stadiums where spectators can take in routines performed by gymnasts from all over the world.

The World Gymnaestrada is the successor to the two Lingiads that were held in Stockholm in 1939 (100 years after Pehr Henrik Ling's death) and 1949.

The name Gymnaestrada is formed from the words gymnastik (international name for all sports relating to gymnastics), estrada (stage) and strada (street). It is believed to have been invented by J H Sommer, chairman of the Royal Dutch Gymnastics Federation and Mrs J. v.d.Most-Leyerweert, member of the board of DGF. They submitted their request for an international meet at the 1951 FIG conference. Zurcaroh from season 13 of America's Got Talent represented Austria at WG in Helsinki.

Host cities

World Gymnaestrada 2007

The 13th World Gymnaestrada was held in Dornbirn in Vorarlberg (Austria) from 8 to 14 July. Over 22,000 gymnasts from 53 nations participated in the event. The opening- and closing ceremonies in the Birkenwiese Stadium had an audience of 30,000 each. The participants were looked after by about 8,000 volunteers.

World Gymnaestrada 2011
The World Gymnaestrada Lausanne 2011 was held in Lausanne, Switzerland, from 10 to 16 July.

The World Gymnaestrada Lausanne 2011 in brief 
 7 days of events
 55 nations
 19,100 participants coming from 5 continents
 Average age 30
 Over 600 hours of demonstrations and shows
 More than 1,800 productions
 4,300 volunteers a day

World Gymnaestrada 2015
The World Gymnaestrada 2015 was held in Helsinki, Finland, from 12 to 18 July. It was the largest event ever held in Finland in terms of number of participants, surpassing even the 1952 Summer Olympics in Helsinki.

The World Gymnaestrada Helsinki 2015 in brief 
 7 days of events
 55 nations
 21,000 participants coming from 5 continents
 Average age 30
 Over 600 hours of demonstrations and shows
 More than 1,800 productions
 almost 4,000 volunteers required

World Gymnaestrada 2019

The 16th World Gymnaestrada in Dornbirn in Vorarlberg (Austria) took place from 7 to 13 July 2019. It was the second time that this event was held in Dornbirn. The festival brought over 18,000 athletes from 66 federations and hundreds of guests to Vorarlberg, achieving record figures in Vorarlberg's tourism sector.

See also
International Gymnastics Federation
Mass games
 Spartakiad (Czechoslovakia)

References

External links
World Gymnaestrada Dornbirn 2007 (Official website)
World Gymnaestrada Lausanne 2011 (Official website)
World Gymnaestrada Helsinki 2015 (Official Website)
World Gymnaestrada Dornbirn 2019 (Official website)
World Gymnaestrada Amsterdam 2023 (Official website)

Gymnastics competitions